V723 Monocerotis is a variable star in the constellation Monoceros. It was proposed in 2021 to be a binary system including a lower mass gap black hole candidate nicknamed "The Unicorn". Located 1,500 light years from Earth, it would be the closest black hole to our planet, and among the smallest ever found.

Located in the Monoceros constellation, V723 Monocerotis is an eighth-magnitude ellipsoidal variable yellow giant star roughly the mass of the Sun, but 25 times its radius. The accompanying black hole was proposed to have a mass 3 times the mass of the Sun, corresponding to a Schwarzschild radius of 9 kilometers.

Follow-up work in 2022 argued that V723 Monocerotis does not contain a black hole, but is a mass-transfer binary containing a red giant and a subgiant star that has been stripped of much of its mass.

See also 
 Stellar black hole
 List of nearest known black holes

References

Further reading
 

Monoceros (constellation)
G-type bright giants
Binary stars
Monocerotis, V723
030891
045762